Dimiter Orahovats (1892—1992) was a prominent Bulgarian physiologist.

References 

Bulgarian physiologists
1892 births
1992 deaths